Lake Lida is a sandy lake located in Otter Tail County, Minnesota, United States. Lida Township is named after the lake and is centered directly over it. "South Lake Lida" is located directly south of the main lake, separated only by a land bridge. Almost adjacent to the north of Lake Lida are comparatively sized Lake Lizzie and smaller Lake Crystal.

Dimensions

Lakes of Otter Tail County, Minnesota
Lakes of Minnesota